Da Bao or Dai Bao, is an extra large version of the Chinese steamed bun. When translated, the name literally means big bun. It is commonly sold in Malaysia and Singapore. Compared to the smaller Xiaolongbao, the Da Bao uses fully fermented dough, giving it a less dense texture.

The common fillings found in the Da Bao usually consist of either pork or chicken minced meat and a hard boiled egg. Other common fillings include mushroom or Chinese sausage. Sweet and vegetarian versions also exist.

See also
 List of buns
 List of steamed foods

References 

Chinese breads
Dim sum
Dumplings
Steamed buns